Octubre Socialista was a left-wing political party active in the province of Jaén, Spain.

History
It was formed in 1986 by Alberto Fernández Malo, who broke away from the Spanish Socialist Workers' Party (PSOE). Fernández had previous been a member of the Socialist Left, a leftist tendency inside PSOE. The party took part in founding the United Left (IU) in 1986.

In the 1993 parliamentary election Octubre Socialista got 540 votes (0.14% of the votes in the province). In the municipality of Torreperogil it obtained 211 votes (4.07%). In the city of Jaén, it obtained  125 votes (0.2%).

Elections

1991 municipal election

1995 municipal election

References

1986 establishments in Spain
Defunct socialist parties in Spain
Political parties established in 1986
Political parties in Andalusia
Political parties with year of disestablishment missing